Methylphenylpiracetam is a derivative of piracetam and a positive allosteric modulator of the sigma-1 receptor. It differs from phenylpiracetam by having a methyl group. 

E1R is the (4R,5S) stereoisomer of methylphenylpiracetam.

Enantiomers
The two R-configuration enantiomers, i.e. (4R,5S) and (4R,5R), of methylphenylpiracetam are more active positive allosteric modulators of the sigma-1 receptor than the two S-configuration enantiomers, i.e. (4S,5R) and (4S,5S).

Effects
E1R enhances cognition and has efficacy against cholinergic dysfunction in mice without affecting locomotor activity. Pretreatment with E1R enhanced the σ1R agonist PRE-084's stimulating effect and facilitated passive avoidance retention. It alleviated scopolamine-induced cognitive impairment. The cognition enhancing activity of E1R is higher than that of (R)-phenylpiracetam.

Because E1R had no effect on locomotor activity, it was found to be free of potential motor side effects.

Legality

Australia 
Methylphenylpiracetam is a schedule 4 substance in Australia under the Poisons Standard (February 2020). A  schedule 4 substance is classified as "Prescription Only Medicine, or Prescription Animal Remedy – Substances, the use or supply of which should be by or on the order of persons permitted by State or Territory legislation to prescribe and should be available from a pharmacist on prescription."

See also
 Diastereomer

References

External links
 Screening profile of 10 μM E1R in vitro binding assays (docx)

Further reading
 

Racetams
Receptor modulators